Rockport is an unincorporated community in Wood County, West Virginia, United States. It lies at an elevation of 705 feet (215 m), along Tygart Creek. It is the last exit in southern Wood County along I-77 and is unincorporated, with the ZIP code of 26169.

References

Unincorporated communities in Wood County, West Virginia
Unincorporated communities in West Virginia